Pierre Barbet (1884–1961) was a French physician, and the chief surgeon at Saint Joseph's Hospital in Paris.

By performing various experiments, Barbet introduced a set of theories on the crucifixion of Jesus. 

In 1950 he wrote a long study called A Doctor at Calvary which was later published as a book. Barbet stated that his experience as a battlefield surgeon during World War I led him to conclude that the image on the Shroud of Turin was authentic, anatomically correct and consistent with crucifixion. As Barbet wrote, "If this is the work of a forger, than the forger would have to have been a trained anatomist, for there is not one single blunder. Indeed, anatomy bears witness to authenticity."

References

1884 births
1961 deaths
French surgeons
Physicians from Paris
Researchers of the Shroud of Turin